The Zimbabwe Olympic Committee (IOC code: ZIM) is the National Olympic Committee representing Zimbabwe. It was created in 1934 and recognised by the IOC in 1980.

Zimbabwe made its debut at the 1980 Summer Olympics held in Moscow, Soviet Union. Previously, it competed as Rhodesia and was banned for a short period in the 1970s. After the country gained its independence, it reformed its Olympic committee.

Presidents of Committee
 present – Mr Admire Masenda

See also
 Zimbabwe at the Olympics

References

External links
 Official website

Zimbabwe
 
Sports governing bodies in Zimbabwe
1934 establishments in Southern Rhodesia
Sports organizations established in 1934